Hiscott is a surname. Notable people with the surname include:

Gillian Hiscott (born 1959), English writer and playwright
James Hiscott (1826–1917), Canadian politician
Jim Hiscott (born 1948), Canadian composer, radio producer and accordionist
Leslie S. Hiscott (1894–1968), British film director and screenwriter